Usman Anwar is a Pakistani police officer who has served as Inspector General of the Punjab Police in the province of Punjab, Pakistan since March 2023.

Career
Anwar had been serving as the Additional Inspector General (AIG) of the Motorway Police before his appointment as the Punjab Inspector General of Police (IGP) in March 2023. Anwar has held various positions within the police force in Pakistan, including as an Additional IG of the Special Branch in Punjab, and as the District Police Officer (DPO) of Okara and Sargodha. He has also worked in the Telecommunication and Elite Police departments.

Anwar's appointment as the Punjab IGP was part of a significant bureaucratic reshuffle by the federal government, which saw him replace Mohammad Aamir Zulfiqar Khan, who was ordered to report to the Establishment Division in Islamabad. Alongside Anwar's appointment, Ghulam Muhammad Dogar was removed from his positions as the Capital City Police Officer (CCPO) of Lahore and as the convener of a Joint Investigation Team (JIT) investigating an attack on Imran Khan, the chairman of the Pakistan Tehreek-e-Insaf party.

References

Living people
Inspector Generals of the Punjab Police (Pakistan)
Pakistani civil servants